Lieutenant General Ajae Kumar Sharma, UYSM, YSM, SM was the former Commander, XVI Corps of the Indian Army and served from 9 October 2016 till 10 October 2017. He assumed the post from Lt General Rajendra Ramrao Nimbhorkar and succeeded was Lt General succeeded by Saranjeet Singh.

Early life and education 
Sharma is an alumnus of Defence Services Staff College, Wellington; Army War College, Mhow; National Defence College, New Delhi. He has also attended a terrorism and security studies course in Germany.

Career 
Sharma was commissioned into 2 Sikh Regiment in 1980. He has commanded 2 Sikh battalion during Operation Parakram; a mountain brigade in Northeast India; an infantry brigade group during UN Mission in Congo and a counter Iinsurgency force in Jammu and Kashmir.

During his career, he has been awarded the Uttam Yudh Seva Medal (2018), Yudh Seva Medal and Sena Medal for his service.

Honours and decorations

References 

Living people
Indian generals
Indian Army officers
Year of birth missing (living people)
National Defence College, India alumni
Recipients of the Uttam Yudh Seva Medal
Recipients of the Yudh Seva Medal
Recipients of the Sena Medal
Army War College, Mhow alumni
Defence Services Staff College alumni